Then Jerico are an English rock band. They scored four top 40 hits in the UK during the 1980s.

Career
The band's early line-up included singer Mark Shaw, bassist Jasper Stainthorpe, drummer Steve Wren, and guitarist Scott Taylor.

The band played at The Limelight Club in New York in 1983 and signed to London Records in 1984. The single "The Big Sweep" was recorded for London but they objected to the lyrical subject matter (an anti-Robert Maxwell/Rupert Murdoch statement). It was initially released by the track's producer Martin Rushent on his own Immaculate label in 1985 and later as a limited edition by London Records along with the new song, "Fault".

The band's songs "Muscle Deep" and "The Motive" charted in 1987. They enjoyed success with two albums, First (The Sound of Music) (1987) co-produced by Mark Shaw and Owen Davies, which reached number 35 in the UK Albums Chart, followed by The Big Area in 1989 that went gold and reached number 4 in the UK Albums Chart. Producer Rick Nowels took care of about than half of the tracks on that album which also led to the appearance of Belinda Carlisle on side vocals on the single "What Does It Take".
 
Released in 1988, ahead of the group's second album, "Big Area" achieved their greatest chart success, peaking at number 13 in the UK Singles Chart.

The original Then Jerico line-up split up in early 1990, with Mark Shaw leaving the band to pursue a solo career. He released his only studio album, Almost for EMI in 1991. It was produced by guitarist Andy Taylor and included two singles, "Love So Bright" and "Under Your Spell". Mark Shaw has also worked off and on with Spandau Ballet lead singer Tony Hadley and the SAS Band.

In 1998, Shaw re-activated Then Jerico, writing the materials for Orgasmaphobia, a self-financed album released on Eagle Rock. The album was co-produced by Mark Shaw and Andy Taylor with collaborations from Taylor, Simple Minds' keyboard player Mick MacNeil and author Iain Banks. In 2000, a live album Alive & Exposed was released by Yeaah! Records credited to 'Then Jerico... Mark Shaw Etc.'. It was a recording made in the summer of 1992 of a concert at the Grand Theatre, Clapham in London. It contained a new song "Step into the Light".

Shaw embarked on a new Then Jerico tour in 2012 with an original line-up of the band, made up of Mark Shaw, guitarists Rob Downes and Scott Taylor, bass player Jasper Stainthorpe and drummer Steve Wren.

A 'Reprise Tour' was launched for 2013 to promote the release of the Reprise compilation album on Warner / Rhino Music with a number of appearances including at Henley's Rewind the 80s Music and at the Let's Rock Bristol festivals.

In February 2014, the 'original' Then Jerico called it a day; however, lead singer Mark Shaw continued, as he vowed to do, with a new line-up to fulfill Let's Rock festival dates in May, June and July that year. In 2015, Shaw played club shows prior to a performance at "Let's Rock London", on Clapham Common, London, on 16 July 2016.

On 27 April 2020, guitarist Scott Taylor died at the age of 58 from a brain tumour.

Band members

Current
Mark Shaw (born Mark Robert Tiplady, 10 June 1961, Chesterfield, Derbyshire, England) – vocals (1983–1990, 1998–present)
 Ryan Williams – guitar
 Magnus Box – bass
 Paul Davis – drums

Former
 Jasper Stainthorpe (born 18 February 1958, Tonbridge, Kent, England) – bass (1983–1989 / 2012–2013)
 Steve Wren (born 26 October 1962, Lambeth, London, England) – drums (1983–1989 / 2012–?)
 Scott Taylor (31 December 1961, Redhill, Surrey, England – 27 April 2020) – guitar (1984–1989 / 2012–2020)
 Cliff Lawrence – guitar (1983)
 Mark Sanderson (born 1961) – keyboards (1983)
 Ben Angwin – keyboards (1984–1985)
 Alex Mungo – keyboards (1985–1988)
 Rob Downes (born 7 December 1961, Cheadle Hulme, Cheshire, England) – guitar (1987–1989 / 2012–?)
 Chris Youdell – keyboards (1988–1989)
 Keith Airey (replaced Scott Taylor on guitar for the Big Area tour in 1989)
 Justin McConville (2010s shows)
 John Miller (2010s shows)
 Paul Davis (2010s shows)
 PJ Phillips - bass/backing vocals (1998–2016)

Their live shows featured the talents of backing vocalist Bari Goddard (who also worked with Cliff Richard, Madonna and Jimmy Somerville among others) and Steve Lee (Joan Armatrading); some of these performances are available on the double CD release Radio Jerico which showcase some Radio 1 sessions and the full Hammersmith Odeon show of 1989.

Discography

Albums

Singles

References

External links
Then Jerico official website

Musical groups established in 1983
English new wave musical groups
English alternative rock groups
Musical groups from London
London Records artists